Leonardo Cecilio Fernández López (born 8 November 1998) is a Uruguayan professional footballer who plays as an attacking midfielder for Liga MX club Toluca.

Club career
Born in Montevideo, Fernández joined Fénix's youth setup in 2011, from lowly CSyD Amanecer. On 31 May 2015, aged just 16, he made his first team – and Primera División – debut, coming on as a late substitute for Martín Ligüera in a 2–0 away loss against Peñarol.

After spending his first two seasons as a backup, Fernández started to appear regularly from the 2017 campaign onwards. He scored his first professional goal on 25 March of that year, netting the winner in a 2–1 home defeat of El Tanque Sisley.

On 4 March 2018, Fernández scored a brace in a 3–2 defeat to Defensor Sporting. On 29 July, he scored a hat-trick in a 5–0 away routing of Cerro, and finished the campaign with 11 goals, playing a key part as his side narrowly avoided relegation.

On 24 June 2019, he joined Tigres UANL for the pre-season but was later loaned to Club Universidad de Chile.

On 12 December 2019, Fernández joined Mexican club Toluca on a season-long loan.

On 2020, he won player of the month of January in the Liga MX.

Career statistics

Club

Honours
Tigres UANL
CONCACAF Champions League: 2020

Individual
Liga MX Player of the Month: January 2020

References

External links

1998 births
Living people
Footballers from Montevideo
Uruguayan footballers
Uruguay youth international footballers
Association football midfielders
Uruguayan Primera División players
Liga MX players
Centro Atlético Fénix players
Tigres UANL footballers
Universidad de Chile footballers
Deportivo Toluca F.C. players